Frustration Plantation is the fourth studio album by American rock band Rasputina,  released by Instinct Records on March 16, 2004.  While not strictly a concept album, Frustration Plantation does have many songs darkly relating to women's lives in the Old South.

Critical reception
In a review for AllMusic, Heather Phares said of the album, "The idea of mixing eerie, Deliverance-style Southern ambience with Rasputina's aesthetic is an inspired one, and it results in their strongest work to date." Andy Hermann of PopMatters praised Melora Creager's songwriting, and said, "Eccentric instrumentation aside, Rasputina are ultimately just a great pop band with an immensely talented frontwoman, and Frustration Plantation is their most entertaining, consistent work to date." Jamie Kiffel of Lollipop Magazine said of the album, "While it might be easy to call Rasputina’s product a gimmick, Creager’s genuine fascination with her subject matter keeps her death and occult sound, for the loss of a better word, fresh."

Track listing

Credits
Melora Creager – Cello, dulcimer, vocals, producer, engineer
Zoë Keating – Cello, vocals, engineer
Jonathon Tebeest – drums, percussion
Joseph Bishara – Producer, drum programming, mixing, engineer
Kenny Dykstra – Engineer 
Tom Baker – Mastering 
Hollis Willa Lane (daughter of Creager) – Vocals on track 14
Symon Chow – Photography, typography, graphic realization

References

2004 albums
Gothic country albums
Rasputina (band) albums